"Wake Me, Shake Me" is a song written by Billy Guy and was recorded by The Coasters for their album, Coast Along with the Coasters. The song reached #14 on the R&B chart and #51 on The Billboard Hot 100 in 1960.

References

1960 singles
The Coasters songs
1960 songs
Atco Records singles